Jessica Margarett "Jema" Casidsid Galanza (born November 28, 1996) is a Filipino volleyball player and former captain of the Adamson Soaring Lady Falcons volleyball team in the UAAP and a National Team Member. She also played for the Laoag Power Smashers during the 2016 SVL Reinforced Conference and has become one of the top spikers for the Creamline Cool Smashers since 2017 in the Premier Volleyball League (PVL).

Personal life
Galanza was born and raised in San Pedro, Laguna, Philippines to Jesse and Fe Galanza. She went to San Pedro Relocation Center National High School, San Pedro, Laguna and earned her bachelor's degree at Adamson University. She has three siblings and her youngest sister, Maria Fe "Mafe" Galanza, played for the University of Santo Tomas' Golden Tigresses.

In March 2018, pictures of Galanza went viral as netizens could not get over her photogenic face and smile while playing volleyball for her school.

Galanza is one of the most-followed streamers in KUMU, where she gained at least 85,000 followers in less than a month since joining the streaming app in September 2021. In an out-of-town game where Galanza was being wildly cheered, she told reporters that her followers were an added motivation to have stellar plays.

Career
In 2013, Galanza debuted as a reserve player of Adamson University in the beach volleyball tournament. She teamed up with star players Bang Pineda and Amanda Villanueva, and they completed a two-game championship sweep of the UAAP Season 76 women’s beach volleyball tournament against University of Santo Tomas.

During her collegiate years, she played with the Adamson Lady Falcons and was the team captain in UAAP Season 80. Galanza is playing for the Creamline Cool Smashers in Premier Volleyball League along with Alyssa Valdez, Jia Morado, Michele Gumabao, and Tots Carlos.

In 2018, Galanza played for the Philippine women's volleyball team that competed in the 2018 Asian Women's Volleyball Cup held at Nakhon Ratchasima, Thailand. During the 2018 Premier Volleyball League Open Conference, Galanza received the 2nd best outside spiker award and together with the Creamline Cool Smashers, eventually won the championship.

During the 2019 Premier Volleyball League Open Conference, she bagged the 1st Best Outside Spiker and Most Valuable Player of the Conference awards and won the third PVL championship title of her current team Creamline Cool Smashers.

In 2021, Galanza was invited to the training pool of the Philippine national volleyball team who would compete in the 2021 Asian Women's Club Volleyball Championship in Thailand from October 01 to 07, 2021.

In 2022, Galanza was again called up in the final line-up of the Philippine national volleyball team and was set for her first SEA games appearance in Hanoi, Vietnam in May 2022.

Eat Bulaga co-host Allan K asked Galanza in her noontime show appearance in August 2021 if she can accept an acting role and she answered in the affirmative; in fact, the genre she wanted was comedy. She ended up starring in Day Zero, an action-horror movie that premiered at a film fest in Switzerland on July 3, 2022, with lead actors Brandon Vera, Joey Marquez, Mary Jean Lastimosa, and Ricci Rivero, among others.

There is no stopping Galanza's professional volleyball onslaught from scoring her career-high 28 points in the Adamson win over UST in the UAAP way back in 2016 to creating a highly unusual play of five straight points for the Cool Smashers via her spikes as part of the 2022 TV5 highlights shown on One Sports half a decade later, not to mention a triple-double of 17 points, 18 excellent digs, and 13 excellent receptions in a thrilling Creamline-Chery Tiggo finals match in the PVL in 2021.

The Cool Smashers' top two highest pointers, Galanza and eventual MVP Carlos, led the team in clinching another crown in the 2022 Premier Volleyball League Invitational Conference at the expense of KingWhale Taipei in a knockout final.

An AVC veteran, Galanza helped the Creamline-powered Philippine National Team take a gallant stand against five-time champion China on August 23, 2022, and the next day, she topscored with 21 points while Carlos and Gumabao added 14 and 13 points in the first win of the host Philippines over Iran.

Awards

Individual 
 2015 16th National Intercollegiate Volleyball “Best Attacker”
 2018 Premier Volleyball League Open Conference "2nd Best Outside Spiker"
 2019 Premier Volleyball League Open Conference "1st Best Outside Spiker"
 2019 Premier Volleyball League Open Conference "Most Valuable Player"

Collegiate 
 2014 UAAP Season 76 Beach Volleyball –  Champion, with Adamson Soaring Lady Falcons
 2014 Shakey's V-League 11th Season 1st Conference –  Bronze medal, with Adamson Soaring Lady Falcons
2014 UNIGAMES Women's Volleyball –  Bronze medal, with Adamson Soaring Lady Falcons 
2015 UNIGAMES Women's Volleyball –  Silver medal, with Adamson Soaring Lady Falcons

Club Team 
 2017 Premier Volleyball League Reinforced Open Conference –  third place, with Creamline Cool Smashers
 2018 Premier Volleyball League Reinforced Conference –  champion, with Creamline Cool Smashers
 2018 Premier Volleyball League Open Conference –  champion, with Creamline Cool Smashers
 2019 Premier Volleyball League Reinforced Conference –  runner-Up, with Creamline Cool Smashers
 2019 Premier Volleyball League Open Conference –  champion, with Creamline Cool Smashers
 2021 Premier Volleyball League Open Conference –  runner-Up, with Creamline Cool Smashers
 2022 Premier Volleyball League Open Conference –  champion, with Creamline Cool Smashers 
 2022 Premier Volleyball League Invitational Conference –  champion, with Creamline Cool Smashers
 2022 Premier Volleyball League Reinforced Conference -  Bronze medal, with Creamline Cool Smashers

References

Living people
Filipino women's volleyball players
Women's beach volleyball players
1996 births
University Athletic Association of the Philippines volleyball players
Adamson University alumni
People from San Pedro, Laguna
Sportspeople from Laguna (province)
Wing spikers
LGBT volleyball players
Filipino LGBT sportspeople
Competitors at the 2021 Southeast Asian Games
Southeast Asian Games competitors for the Philippines
21st-century Filipino women
Outside hitters